Ibrahim ibn Habib ibn Sulayman ibn Samura ibn Jundab Banu Fazara|al-Fazari (died 777) was an 8th century mathematician and astronomer at the Abbasid court of the Caliph Al-Mansur (r. 754775). His son Muḥammad ibn Ibrāhīm al-Fazārī was also an astronomer. He composed various astronomical writings ("On the astrolabe", "On the armillary spheres", "on the calendar").

The caliph ordered al-Fazārī and his son to translate the Indian astronomical text, The Sindhind, along with Yaʿqūb ibn Ṭāriq, which was completed in Baghdad about 750, and entitled . This translation was possibly the vehicle by means of which the Hindu numeral system (the modern number notation) was transmitted from India to Iran.

At the end of the 8th century, whilst at the court of the Abbasid Caliphate, al-Fazārī mentioned Ghana, "the land of gold."

See also
Ya'qubi

Notes

Further reading 
 H. Suter: Die Mathematiker und Astronomer der Araber (3, 208, 1900)
 Richard Nelson Frye: The Golden Age of Persia

External links 
  (PDF version)

777 deaths
Year of birth unknown
Astrologers of the medieval Islamic world
8th-century mathematicians
Mathematicians from the Abbasid Caliphate
Astronomers from the Abbasid Caliphate
Astronomers of the medieval Islamic world
8th-century people from the Abbasid Caliphate
8th-century astronomers
8th-century astrologers
8th-century Arabic writers
8th-century Arabs